John Dearman is a Grammy Award-winning classical guitarist and one of the founding members of the Los Angeles Guitar Quartet (LAGQ). Known to LAGQ fans as the group's seven-string virtuoso who supplies the deep-bass lines for numerous pieces in the quartet's eclectic repertoire.

Dearman holds a Bachelor of Music and Master of Music from the Thornton School of Music at the University of Southern California.

He is on faculty at California State University, Northridge.

References

External links
 Los Angeles Guitar Quartet

American classical guitarists
American male guitarists
Grammy Award winners
Year of birth missing (living people)
Living people
USC Thornton School of Music alumni